The Last Night is a 1949 German drama film directed by Eugen York and starring Sybille Schmitz, Karl John,  Margarete Haagen. It was made by the Hamburg-based company Real Film at the Wandsbek Studios. The film's sets were designed by Herbert Kirchhoff. The film is set in German-occupied France in 1944 where a female resistance operative and a German army officer fall in love. It was not a box office success on its release.

Cast

References

Bibliography

External links 
 

1949 films
1940s war drama films
German war drama films
1940s German-language films
West German films
Films directed by Eugen York
Films about the French Resistance
Real Film films
German black-and-white films
1949 drama films
1940s German films
Films shot at Wandsbek Studios